Fenglin is a town of Liling City in Hunan Province, China. The town was established by merging the historic Fenglinshi Township and Huangtazui Town on November 26, 2015. As of 2015, it had a population of 42,900 and an area of 100.52 square kilometers.

References

Divisions of Liling